城南 ("the south of a castle/city"; Pinyin Chéngnán; Revised Romanization of Korean Seongnam; Hepburn romanization Jōnan) may refer to:

Seongnam, a city in South Korea
Chengnan, a subdistrict of Qianjiang District, Chongqing, People's Republic of China
Chengnan, a subdistrict of Chaoyang District, Shantou, PRC
Jōnan-ku, Fukuoka, a ward of Fukuoka, Japan
Jōnan, Kumamoto, a former town of Kumamoto Prefecture, Japan

See also
Chengbei (disambiguation) "the north of a castle/city"
城東區 (disambiguation) "the east of a castle/city"